A ticket is a voucher that indicates that an individual is entitled to admission to an event or establishment such as a theatre, amusement park, or tourist attraction, or has a right to travel on a vehicle, such as with an airline ticket, bus ticket or train ticket. An individual typically pays for a ticket, but it may be free of charge. A ticket may serve simply as proof of entitlement or reservation. A ticket may be valid for any seat (called "free seating" or "open seating") or for a specific one (called "allocated seating" or "reserved seating").

Overview
Members of the public can buy a ticket at a ticket window or counter, called a box office in the entertainment industry (this term is also used for the total receipts), or in some cases online or by telephone. The ticket check may also be located at the box office, or it may be elsewhere. Tickets may also be available from resellers, which typically are commercial enterprises that purchase tickets in bulk and resell them to members of the public, adding a surcharge; consumers buy from resellers for reasons of convenience and availability. The convenience factor relates to being able to obtain tickets locally and being able to make alternate selections on the spot, if the preferred performance is not available. The availability factor relates to the fact that all tickets may have been sold out at the box office, requiring the purchaser to either obtain tickets from the reseller, or not to attend the event (or at least not see the particular performance of choice).

Sometimes, for some bus or train journeys, both free or allocated seating are available, typically with an increased charge for a reserved seat. On some conveyances, a passenger with a free seating ticket on a bus or train carries the risk of having to stand. In contrast, in an arena, cinema, or theatre, a free seating ticket means that a seat is guaranteed, just not a specific one.

Paper or card is generally used, although plastic may be used instead for durability. Some have a barcode or magnetic stripe for keeping simple data stored on them; higher end tickets include chips that store more data and prevent counterfeiting.

A paper ticket often is perforated so it can be separated into two parts, one (the ticket stub) to be kept by the customer, and one to be kept by the ticket controller. Whether or not one can leave and reenter with the customer's ticket stub only varies. It may not be allowed to avoid subsequent use of one ticket by multiple people, or even simultaneous use by giving the ticket to someone before the ticket check (if this is physically possible), but it may also be allowed, e.g., in a movie theatre to allow the stub holder to use the facilities (restroom, telephone, water fountain) or buy, during a movie, a snack or drink before the ticket check and reenter.

A ticket may be printed in advance, or fully or partly printed when issued, or it may be a printed form that is completed in handwriting (e.g., by a train conductor who does not carry a ticket machine, but just a supply of forms and a pen).

Security issues

Counterfeit tickets are a problem at high-priced concerts and other events, so holograms are used on tickets for the FIFA World Cup, Olympic Games, Super Bowl, and other high-profile events.

The fraudulent practice of passing-back a ticket can be overcome by making the ticket in the form of a tamper-proof wristband.

When paying online for admission one may get a code, or a ticket that can be printed out, or shown on one's mobile device to be scanned or verified by the ticket taker.  At the premises, it is made sure that the same right of admission is not used by other parties.

Internet ticket fraud has become widespread, with authentic-looking but fake ticket websites taking customers' money but not delivering the tickets, notably for the 2008 Beijing Olympic Games (through websites not based in China).

Virtual queueing

Free tickets are applied in virtual queueing. In a place where one has to wait one's turn, there may be the system that one takes a ticket with a number from a dispenser. This system is usually found in hospitals and surgeries, and at offices where many people visit, like town halls, social security offices, labor exchanges, or post offices.

Another form of virtual queuing is where the ticket carries a time-slot on it, rather than just a sequentially incremented number. This type of ticket would allow someone to do other things and then return for a roller-coaster ride, for example, without having to actually stand and wait in line.

NFT ticketing
NFT (non-fungible token) ticketing is an innovation within the ticketing industry using blockchain technology to create immutable digital tickets, replacing or complementing their paper counterparts. The entry of NFT ticketing has changed the resale market and brought about a dramatic change in the funding sources for a segment of individual artists and groups.

Coach(Bus) ticket

A coach ticket is a document created by a coach (bus) operator or a travel agent to confirm that an individual has reserved a seat on a coach. This document is then used to obtain travel on the operators coach fleet. Only with this ticket is the passenger allowed to board the coach.

A paper ticket is only good for the coach operator for which it was purchased. Usually the paper ticket is for a specific journey. It is sometimes possible to purchase an 'open' ticket which allows travel on any coach between the destinations listed on the ticket. The cost for doing this is often greater than a ticket for a specific journey.

Some tickets are refundable. However the lower cost tickets are usually not refundable and may carry many additional restrictions.

It is now common for a traveller to print out tickets online and use these on coaches instead of having tickets sent to them in the traditional way. Many coach operators use this system to save costs; some allow a text from the operator to act as a ticket with a unique reference number.

Pass

A pass is a special ticket, representing some subscription, in particular for unlimited use of a service or collection of services.  Sometimes the pass replaces the tickets, sometimes it entitles the holder to free tickets. In the latter case, typically both the pass and the ticket has to be shown at the ticket check.

Alternatively, there is the discount pass, for services such as those above: for a fee per unit time (or as a benefit on other grounds) one gets a discount on each purchase. Alternatively, a multi-use ticket (either valid a limited time, or indefinitely) may provide a discount. For example, a pass for entering a cinema 6 times within a year may cost the price of 4 or 5 tickets. A multi-use ticket may or may not be personal. If not, there may be a limitation to the number of people who can use the same multi-use ticket at the same time.

Collecting (hobby) 
After its original use, tickets can serve as a collectible item and collecting them is an internationally spread hobby. A ticket's value for collectors is mainly based on the event connected to it. Other important criteria for collectors might be rarity, theme, or even a country of issue. Collectors typically use online catalogs as the information source for tickets. In addition to acquiring tickets by themselves, collectors often trade between each other or purchase used tickets from online marketplaces.

Gallery

See also
 Public transport ticket systems
 Ticket machine
 Ticket resale, or "scalping"
 Season ticket
 Transfer ticket
 Rover, a UK bus/train ticket

References

Legal documents
Tickets
Paper products